The 2009 ECM Prague Open was a tennis tournament played on outdoor clay courts. It was the 8th edition of the ECM Prague Open, and was part of the WTA International tournaments of the 2009 WTA Tour. It took place in Prague, Czech Republic, from July 13 through July 19, 2009.

The tournament included tennis exhibition involving Pat Cash, Mansour Bahrami and Henri Leconte.

WTA entrants

Seeds

Seedings are based on the rankings of July 6, 2009.

Other entrants
The following players received wildcards into the singles main draw

  Kristína Kučová
  Zarina Diyas
  Karolína Plíšková

The following players received entry from the qualifying draw:
  Timea Bacsinszky
  Kristina Mladenovic
  Ksenia Pervak
  Petra Martić

Finals

Singles

 Sybille Bammer defeated  Francesca Schiavone, 7–64, 6–2
 It was Bammers first title of the year, and the second of her career.

Doubles

 Alona Bondarenko /  Kateryna Bondarenko defeated  Iveta Benešová /  Barbora Záhlavová-Strýcová, 6–1, 6–2

External links
 Official website

ECM Prague Open
2009
2009 in Czech tennis